Marc Angéle Vanderlinden or van der Linden (born 4 February 1964 in Merksem) is a Belgian former footballer.

He began his career with his local side SC Merksem before moving to Royal Antwerp FC in 1982. After seven seasons with the club he moved to R.S.C. Anderlecht in 1989 before joining K.A.A. Gent two years later. In 1995, he moved to Israel to play for Ironi Rishon LeZion and then Maccabi Herzliya before returning to his original club in 1997. Van der Linden continued to play for Merksem until 2002 when he retired. He also played 19 times for the Belgium national football team, scoring nine goals and appearing in the 1990 FIFA World Cup.

Honours

Player

Anderlecht 

 Belgian First Division: 1990–91
 European Cup Winners' Cup: 1989–90 (runners-up)

Individual 

 1990 FIFA World Cup qualification top scorer (7 goals)

References

External links

1964 births
Belgian footballers
Flemish sportspeople
Living people
Footballers from Antwerp
People from Merksem
Royal Antwerp F.C. players
R.S.C. Anderlecht players
K.A.A. Gent players
Maccabi Herzliya F.C. players
Hapoel Rishon LeZion F.C. players
K. Beerschot V.A.C. players
Belgium international footballers
1990 FIFA World Cup players
Belgian expatriate footballers
Expatriate footballers in Israel
Belgian expatriate sportspeople in Israel
Belgian Pro League players
Liga Leumit players
Association football forwards